The Cameron School is a historic school building in Nashville, Tennessee, United States. Construction began in 1939, and it was completed in 1940. It was built as a project of the Public Works Administration. It was designed by architect Henry C. Hibbs in the Gothic Revival architectural style. It was named in honor of Henry Alvin Cameron, a science teacher and World War I casualty. It has been listed on the National Register of Historic Places since March 15, 2005.

References

School buildings completed in 1940
Buildings and structures in Nashville, Tennessee
Gothic Revival architecture in Tennessee
Historically black schools